George Herbert Wood (February 17, 1867 – May 15, 1949) was a Canadian businessman who co-founded Wood Gundy and Company, stockbrokerage in Toronto in 1905 with fellow former Dominion Securities employee James Henry Gundy.

Early years
Wood was born in Rock Ferry, England, on February 17, 1867, and arrived in Canada as child with his family in 1874.

After graduation Wood worked for his father George William Wood at Atlas Assurance Company before moving on to Dominion Securities. He retired from the business in 1930 and died at his home in Toronto in 1949.

Personal
In 1892 he married Maude Staveley and divided their time in Toronto and in England.

Wood and his wife are buried at Mount Pleasant Cemetery, Toronto.

Legacy
His name and that of Gundy lives in the retail investment arm of CIBC World Markets.

References

Canadian businesspeople
Stock and commodity market managers
Stockbrokers
1867 births
1949 deaths